Mizui is a Japanese surname and toponym. Its meaning differs depending on the kanji used to write it.

Kanji
Kanji used to write the name Mizui include:
, "place where the water is"
, "water well"
, "auspicious clothing"
 "heart-purification clothing"

People
, Japanese badminton player
Hisako Mizui, represented Japan in Badminton at the 1996 Summer Olympics – Women's singles
Seiji Mizui, Japanese rear admiral of the Second World War, commanding officer of the 18th Cruiser Division (Imperial Japanese Navy)
, Japanese badminton player
Shinji Mizui (born 1974), member of Pierrot (band)

Fictional characters
Mizui, character in 2005 Japanese film My God, My God, Why Hast Thou Forsaken Me?

Places
,  Echizen Railway Mikuni Awara Line railway station located in Sakai, Fukui Prefecture, Japan

References

Japanese-language surnames